Walker is a soundtrack by Joe Strummer, released in 1987. It is the soundtrack to the Alex Cox film of the same name. Originally released on LP, Cassette, and CD in 1987 on the Virgin Movie Music label, the album was released, remastered and with bonus tracks, by Astralwerks in 2005.

Track listing
All tracks written by Joe Strummer. Recorded and mixed by Sam Lehmer at Russian Hill Recording San Francisco.

Musicians
 Joe Strummer - Vocals, Producer, String Arrangements, Horn Arrangements
 Zander Schloss - Guitar, Charango, Vihuela, Banjo, Guitarron, Tambour, Guitar Arrangements
 Rebeca Mauleón - Piano, Organ
 Michael Spiro - Congas, Bongos, Timbales, Percussion
 Rich Girard - Bass
 Richard Zobel - Harmonica, Vocal, Mandolin, Banjo
 Mary Fettig - Tenor & Soprano Sax, Flute
 Dick Bright - Country Fiddle, Violin
 Michael Hatfield - Marimba, Vibes, Piano Organ
 David Bendigkiet - Trumpet
 John Worley - Trumpet
 Dean Hubbard - Trombone
 John Tenney - Violin
 Dean Franke - Violin
 Susan Chan - Viola
 Stephen Mitchell - Snare Drum
 Dan Levin - Fast Piano
 Sam Lehmer - Special SFX, Bass Drum

Joe Strummer albums
1987 soundtrack albums
1980s film soundtrack albums
EMI Records soundtracks
Astralwerks soundtracks